White River Amphitheatre is a Live Nation managed concert venue, located  east of Auburn, Washington and  west of Enumclaw, Washington on the Muckleshoot Indian Reservation. The capacity is 16,000, with 9,000 covered seats. Completed in 2003, the 98-acre (40 ha) project cost more than $30 million and hosts musical events under an acoustically treated metal roof; it features two 30-by-40-foot (9x12 m) video screens on either side of the stage.

History
White River Amphitheater opened on June 14, 2003. Home-town stars Heart were the opening act. Although ground had been broken eight years earlier, the project had been delayed due to the environmental impact statement and traffic concerns.

The Army Corps of Engineers signed off on construction in September 2002. In February 2003, the Washington State Department of Transportation "issued a permit allowing access from crowded, two-lane state Route 164."

When it opened, the venue was operated by the Muckleshoot Indian Tribe, Clear Channel Entertainment and Bill Graham Presents. Today it is operated by Live Nation; they reduced capacity from 20,000 to 16,000 in 2015. To mitigate traffic, the venue offers shuttles from (and to) the Auburn Super Mall, which was renamed The Outlet Collection Seattle for some concerts. Shuttles depart after they are filled, with 42 people per shuttle.

Notable concerts
Jimmy Buffett released a CD of his September 16, 2003 performance, called Live in Auburn, WA.

Heavy metal band Iron Maiden has also performed here on their last few tours including Eddie Rips Up The World Tour, The Somewhere Back In Time World Tour, and The Final Frontier World Tour. During the show on June 22, 2010, Frontman Bruce Dickinson stated that the pit was the only one at 100% capacity on the tour so far. Iron Maiden performed here during their Maiden England World Tour on 30 July 2012.

Sting performed during his Symphonicities Tour on June 6, 2010, along with the Royal Philharmonic Orchestra. Rancid performed on September 2, 2011.

The amphitheatre has played host to music festivals, including  Crüe Fest and Crüe Fest 2,  Farm Aid, The Gigantour, The Mayhem Festival,  Projekt Revolution, Ozzfest, and The Uproar Festival. Since 2010, the KISW Pain in the Grass festival has been held here. It hosted the Vans Warped Tour for two years straight, hosting Warped Tour 2012 and Warped Tour 2013.

See also
List of contemporary amphitheatres

References

External links

Amphitheaters in the United States
Buildings and structures in Auburn, Washington
Music venues in Washington (state)
Tourist attractions in King County, Washington
2003 establishments in Washington (state)